Ihor Zhuk (born March 19, 1992) is a Ukrainian footballer who plays as a defender.

Career 
Zhuk played in the Ukrainian Second League in the 2009–10 season with NK Veres Rivne. He returned the following season and appeared in 12 matches. In 2014, he played with Fk Sokil Sadove. In 2019, he played abroad in the Canadian Soccer League with Kingsman SC.

References  
 

Living people
1992 births
Association football defenders
Ukrainian footballers
NK Veres Rivne players
Ukrainian Second League players
Canadian Soccer League (1998–present) players